Pokkiri Raja is a 1982 Indian Tamil-language action comedy film directed by S. P. Muthuraman and written by Panchu Arunachalam. A remake of the Telugu film Chuttalunnaru Jagratha (1980), it stars Rajinikanth, Sridevi and Raadhika. The film revolves around a man who was framed for murder, and a lookalike who aids him in finding the true killers. It was released on 14 January 1982 and became a commercial success, running for over 100 days in theatres.

Plot 

Ramesh is the manager of the office of Paranthaman, an industrialist. Paranthaman strongly suspects his relatives to be looting him. Ramesh finds the culprit and keeps a tight leash on everything happening in the office, thereby earning the wrath of the industrialist's relatives. Ramesh and Vanaja (Paranthaman's daughter) initially find themselves at loggerheads, but eventually fall in love with each other. Paranthaman is happy about this development until he sees Ramesh cheating on his daughter. He fires Ramesh the very same day.

Paranthaman is murdered and Vanaja also sees Ramesh in her house that same night. Ramesh is dragged to court and, based on Vanaja's testimony, declared guilty and arrested, though he realises she was threatened into committing perjury. A month into prison, Ramesh meets Raja, a soon-to-be-released convict who looks exactly like him. Raja is a petty thief who had been arrested for breaking into Paranthaman's house, and was mistaken by Vanaja to be Ramesh. Together, Ramesh and Raja plan to bring the culprits to book.

With Raja's permission, Ramesh masquerades as him for three days. Venkatachalam initially attempts to have him arrested for escaping, but fails after Raja's lover Rakkayi identifies him as Raja, and takes him. Venkatachalam approaches "Raja", not knowing it is Ramesh, and tells him about Vanaja's impending marriage to Chandran. Ramesh rescues Vanaja from her forced marriage, tells her about Raja, how she and her father mistook him for Ramesh, and keeps her safe at his mother's house. Venkatachalam and Chandran suspect Vanaja. Ramesh marries Vanaja at his mother's request. At the end of three days, he returns to prison and switches places with Raja, who reunites with Rakkayi and tells her about Ramesh taking his place. Ramesh eventually attains bail, courtesy Vanaja.

Chandran later reveals himself and Venkatachalam as the murderers of Paranthaman, but Raja records the entire statement on tape; after Ramesh and Raja subdue Chandran and Venkatachalam's thugs, the tape is played in the court, and both killers are arrested.

Cast 

 Rajinikanth as Ramesh and Raja
 Sridevi as Vanaja
 Raadhika as Rakkayi
 R. Muthuraman as Venkatachalam
 Manorama as Venkatachalam's wife
 Y. G. Mahendran as Chandran

Production 
Pokkiri Raja is a remake of the Telugu film Chuttalunnaru Jagratha (1980), and was Rajinikanth's first film opposite Raadhika. M. Saravanan of AVM Productions expressed a desire to remake it in Tamil; he wanted Rajinikanth to play the male lead. Rajinikanth refused to act in the film as he was unimpressed with the Telugu film and character but later relented after Saravanan requested him to act. Saravanan called Visu who, after watching the film, said it could be remade well with minor changes and further developed Raadhika's character.

The film was colourised using Eastmancolor. It was Muthuraman's final film as actor and he portrayed a negative role. Since he died before the film's release, the crew brought in a dubbing artist to imitate his voice.

Soundtrack 
The soundtrack was composed by M. S. Viswanathan, with lyrics by Kannadasan and Gangai Amaran.

Release and reception 
Pokkiri Raja was released on 14 January 1982, Pongal day. The film became a commercial success, running for over 100 days in theatres. Along with Murattu Kaalai (1980), it was responsible for establishing Rajinikanth as a full-fledged action hero.

References

Bibliography

External links 
 

1980s action comedy films
1980s masala films
1980s Tamil-language films
1982 films
AVM Productions films
Films about miscarriage of justice
Films directed by S. P. Muthuraman
Films scored by M. S. Viswanathan
Films with screenplays by Panchu Arunachalam
Indian action comedy films
Tamil remakes of Telugu films